fortune is a program that displays a pseudorandom message from a database of quotations that first appeared in Version 7 Unix. The most common version on modern systems is the BSD fortune, originally written by Ken Arnold. Distributions of fortune are usually bundled with a collection of themed files, containing sayings like those found on fortune cookies (hence the name), quotations from famous people, jokes, or poetry. As of November 2017, the quotations (with the exception of tips relevant to system operation) have been removed from FreeBSD entirely after user complaints regarding quotations from Adolf Hitler being contained in some of the files.

fortune is predominantly found on Unix-like systems, but clients for other platforms also exist. Often, users on text-mode Unix terminals will place this command into either their .profile or .logout files to display them at logon and logout, respectively. It is also used to generate text input for certain XScreenSaver modes. It is possible to pipe fortune into the cowsay command, to add more humor to the dialog.

Content
Most Unix systems use fortunes which are slanted heavily toward the user base of Unix, and thus contain many obscure jokes about computer science and computer programming. Other favoured sources include quotations from science fiction (Star Trek, The Cyberiad, Doctor Who, The Hitchhiker's Guide to the Galaxy, etc.), Zippy the Pinhead, and the writings of Ambrose Bierce and Dave Barry. Most fortune collections also include a wide variety of more conventionally sourced quotations, jokes, and other short passages. A few distributions include "offensive" dicta, which require the -a or -o options to be passed for viewing. These fortunes often include rude humor and profanity, personal attacks, and controversial comments about religion. Sometimes they are provided by another package, however as of FreeBSD 10.0 the offensive dicta have been removed completely. The exact fortunes vary between each type of Unix, however there seems to be a strong overlap between the FreeBSD and OpenBSD fortune files. The Plan 9 fortune files seem to be much shorter, with many just on 1 line, and the 'offensive' dicta is much stronger. Most Linux distributions, such as Debian (and its derivatives), choose the FreeBSD fortunes to put in their fortune packages, that can be installed through the package manager.

Purpose
One of the included fortunes, from the "goedel" collection of fortunes about fortune itself, sums up the purpose of the program:

The original fortune program could be used for the more general task of picking up a random line from a plain-text file. The example of such use is given in the rc documentation. However, in most modern Unix systems fortune cannot be used this way, since they use an ad hoc file format for fortune files to allow multiline aphorisms.

Fortune files
Conventional versions of fortune use two files for each quotation list: a text file with quotations, each separated by the character "%" on its own line, and a random-access data file generated by the strfile(1) program. Alternative implementations, including those made for display on Web pages, typically use only the text file.

Common options
Several common options exist that change the way command-line versions of fortune behave:

See also
 QOTD

References

External links
 
 
 A PHP version of the fortune program
 The manual page for the original Unix fortune(6) command.
 Maintenance version of fortune-mod's source code - on GitHub with new releases
 ftp://ftp.ibiblio.org/pub/linux/games/amusements/fortune/ – source code for fortune-mod program
 A wiki containing all of the original non offensive fortunes
 A modern, color-terminal oriented fortune database
 A fortune-mod add on for math-related fortunes
 A portable and full implementation in Python, distributed with all the classical and historical cookie files

1979 software
Unix software
Novelty software
Free and open-source Android software
Plan 9 commands